Brown rice tea, called hyeonmi-cha (lit. "brown rice water"),  (lit.

Preparation 
This tea is prepared by infusing roasted brown rice in boiling water. Brown japonica rice is typically used in Korea. The rice is washed, soaked, roasted in a dry pan or pot, and cooled. Rice grains may be strained before serving. The beverage may range from pale yellow to light golden brown in color.

Pre-roasted rice used to make hyenomi-cha is available commercially in groceries, traditional markets, and supermarkets in Korea and Korean groceries overseas.

Similar drinks and blends 
Hyeonmi-cha can be blended with nokcha (green tea) to produce hyeonmi-nokcha (brown rice green tea). In Japan, a similar green tea is called genmaicha, which is a cognate of hyeonmi-cha.

Bori-cha, memil-cha, and oksusu-cha are other traditional Korean teas prepared in a similar way with barley, buckwheat, and corn.

Sungnyung is a drink made from scorched rice. Water is directly added to a pot where the scorched crust of rice—most commonly white rice—is left in the bottom when it is still hot. Unlike hyeonmi-cha, the rice grains are simmered for a relatively long time until soft, and may be consumed together with the liquid.

See also 
 Bori-cha – barley tea
 Memil-cha – buckwheat tea
 Oksusu-cha – corn tea
 Roasted grain beverage

References 

Herbal tea
Korean tea
Rice drinks